New York, Susquehanna & Western Railroad ALCO Type S-2 Locomotive is located in Maywood, Bergen County, New Jersey, United States. The locomotive was and added to the National Register of Historic Places on March 19, 2010. The locomotive is located adjacent to the Maywood Station Museum and is owned by the volunteer, 501(C)3 non-profit Maywood Station Historical Committee. In keeping with Susquehanna numbering practice, 206 (being even numbered) was MU-able to other locomotives. 206 last operated in early June 1985 before having a lube oil pressure failure that damaged it's 539 Macintosh and Seymore prime mover. As the Susquehanna was phasing out the last of the Alco's in the mid 80's (selling off or scrapping the remaining RS-1's and 3's) 206 was never repaired but was stored and retired in 1986 when it was decided to retire instead of repair.

See also
 National Register of Historic Places listings in Bergen County, New Jersey
 New York, Susquehanna and Western Railway

References

External links
 Photos of New York, Susquehanna & Western Railroad ALCO Type S-2 Locomotive
 Maywood Station Museum

Maywood, New Jersey
Railway locomotives on the National Register of Historic Places
National Register of Historic Places in Bergen County, New Jersey
New Jersey Register of Historic Places
New York, Susquehanna and Western Railway
Rail transportation on the National Register of Historic Places in New York (state)